Oleg Serebrian (born 13 July 1969) is a Moldovan politician, writer, diplomat and political scientist, President of the Latin Union between 2010 and 2012.

Biography 
He studied law and history at the Ion Creangă State Pedagogical University in Chișinău and international relations at the European Institute of High International Studies in Nice, France. Serebrian entered the Ministry of Foreign Affairs of Moldova in 1992. In 1998 he was awarded his doctorate in political sciences. In 1998-1999 he served as spokesperson of Moldova's Ministry of Foreign Affairs. Between 1999 and 2003, he was Deputy Rector of the Free University of Moldova.

Between May 2001 and February 2008 Serebrian was Chairman of the Social Liberal Party. On February 10, 2008, after merging of Social Liberal Party with Democratic Party of Moldova (DPM) he was elected First Deputy Chairman of DPM. Between March 2005 and July 2010 he was Member of the Parliament of Moldova (reelected for a second term in 2009).

Between July 2010 and July 2015 he was Ambassador of Moldova to France and UNESCO. From November 2015 to January 2022 he was the Moldovan Ambassador to Germany.

He is the author of several books on international affairs and geopolitics.

Since 19 January 2022, Serebrian is the Deputy Prime Minister for Reintegration of the Republic of Moldova.

Major works
Geopolitica spaţiului pontic (Geopolitics of the Black Sea Region, 1998)
Politosfera (Politosphere, 2001)
Politică şi geopolitică (Politics and Geopolitics, 2004)
Dicţionar de geopolitică (Dictionary of Geopolitics, 2006)
Despre geopolitică (About Geopolitics, 2009)
Cântecul mării (Song of the Sea, 2011), novel
Rusia la răspântie (Russia at the crossroads, 2014)
Woldemar (2018), novel

References

External links
 Latin Union official site 

1969 births
People from Ocnița District
Living people
Moldova State University alumni
Geopoliticians
Moldovan political scientists
Government ministers of Moldova
Democratic Party of Moldova MPs
Moldovan MPs 2005–2009
Moldovan MPs 2009–2010
Ambassadors of Moldova to France
Permanent Delegates of Moldova to UNESCO
Moldovan writers
Moldovan male writers
Officers of the Order of the Star of Romania